The Lambert Trophy is an annual award given to the best team in the East in Division I FBS (formerly I-A) college football.
In affiliation with the Metropolitan New York Football Writers (founded 1935), the Lambert Trophy was established by brothers Victor A. and Henry L. Lambert in memory of their father, August V. Lambert. The Lamberts were the principals in a distinguished Madison Avenue jewelry house and were prominent college football boosters. 

By the time the “Lambert Trophy” was established in 1936, major schools in other regions of the country had formed their own leagues (i.e., SEC, Big Ten, Big Eight, Pacific Coast Conference, etc.) and Division I FBS (formerly I–A) schools located in the Northeast and Mid-Atlantic regions remained independent, with the exception of the 1954 formation of the Ivy League. Emblematic of the "Eastern championship", the Lambert Trophy, voted on by a panel of sports writers in New York, became the de facto conference championship for those schools.

Since 1936, there have been 19 different winners in Division I-A/FBS. To be eligible for the Lambert Award, a school must be located in the "East."  Teams in the "East" include teams located in New York, New Jersey, Massachusetts, Pennsylvania, Maryland, Virginia, West Virginia, Delaware and the District of Columbia (although there are no FBS teams in Delaware nor Washington D.C., there are teams that compete at lower levels that can win the various Lambert Cup awards for their levels).  Additionally, while the Big East Conference was a football conference, members of that conference outside of the "East" were also made eligible if at least half their schedule was against Lambert-eligible teams.

A set of parallel trophies collectively known as the Lambert Cup is awarded to teams in Division I FCS (formerly I-AA), Division II, and Division III.  The Metropolitan New York Football Writers, owned and operated by American Football Networks, Inc., took the administration of the Lambert Meadowlands Awards back from the New Jersey Sports & Exhibition Authority in 2011.

Lambert Trophy winners

By year

By team

^ Now a member of the NCAA Division I Football Championship Subdivision (FCS).† Now a member of NCAA Division III.

* No longer eligible to win Lambert Trophy

Lambert Cup

Football Championship Subdivision (Division I-AA)

NOTE:  The Ivy League, and until 1997, the Patriot League, do/did not participate in the NCAA Division I Football Tournament.

Most FCS Lambert Cups 

† Now a member of the Football Bowl Subdivision (FBS).
‡ Discontinued football

Division II

Most D-II Lambert Cups 

‡ Now a member of the Football Bowl Subdivision (FBS).
† Now a member of the Football Championship Subdivision (FCS).
^ Now a member of Division III.

Division III

Most D-III Lambert Cups 

† Now a member of the Football Championship Subdivision (FCS).
‡ Now a member of Division II.
^ Discontinued football

References

College football championship trophies
Awards established in 1936
1936 establishments in the United States